Yinxian is a town of Shou County in central Anhui province, China. It has 2 residential communities and 8 villages under its administration.

References 

Towns in Anhui
Shou County